Licata is a city and comune located on the south coast of Sicily, Italy.

Licata may also refer to:

 A.S.D. Licata Calcio, Italian association football club located in Licata, Sicily
 Licata Airfield, abandoned World War II military airfield in Italy, near Licata, Sicily.
 Licata (surname), Italian surname